Forest Knolls is an unincorporated community in Marin County, California. For census purposes, Forest Knolls is aggregated with Lagunitas into the census-designated place Lagunitas-Forest Knolls.

The first post office at Forest Knolls opened in 1916. Forest Knolls' ZIP Code is 94933.

There are a number of small historical businesses in Forest Knolls such as the Papermill Creek Saloon.

References

Unincorporated communities in California
Unincorporated communities in Marin County, California
West Marin